The Renault R.S.17 is a Formula One racing car designed and constructed by the Renault Sport Formula One Team to compete during the 2017 Formula One season. The chassis was designed by Nick Chester, Chris Cooney, Martin Tolliday and Jon Tomlinson with Bob Bell overseeing the design and production of the car as chief technical officer and Rémi Taffin leading the powertrain design.

The car was initially driven by Nico Hülkenberg and Jolyon Palmer. Hülkenberg joined the team after Kevin Magnussen left the team at the end of the  season, while Palmer was replaced by Carlos Sainz Jr. from the 2017 United States Grand Prix onwards. The R.S.17 made its competitive début at the 2017 Australian Grand Prix.

Complete Formula One results
(key) (results in bold indicate pole position; results in italics indicate fastest lap)

Notes
† – Driver failed to finish the race, but was classified as they had completed greater than 90% of the race distance.

References

R.S.17
2017 Formula One season cars